Richard Webster Lawrence (July 22, 1906 – June 1974) was an American bobsledder who competed in the 1930s. He won the bronze medal in the two-man event at the 1936 Winter Olympics in Garmisch-Partenkirchen and finished sixth in the four-man event at those same games.

He died in Rochester, New York.

References
1936 bobsleigh four-man results
Bobsleigh two-man Olympic medalists 1932-56 and since 1964
DatabaseOlympics.com profile

1906 births
1974 deaths
American male bobsledders
Bobsledders at the 1936 Winter Olympics
Olympic bronze medalists for the United States in bobsleigh
Sportspeople from New York (state)
Medalists at the 1936 Winter Olympics